V.E.L.M. (Vivi e lascia morire) is the ninth studio album by the Italian rapper Bassi Maestro, released in 2006 under Sano Business.

Track listing

Link 

2006 albums
Bassi Maestro albums